Palle Raghunatha Reddy is a Member of the Legislative Assembly (MLA) of Andhra Pradesh, state in southern part of India, representing the constituency of Puttaparthi for the Telugu Desam Party from 2014 To 2019.

Biography
He was first elected in 1999 at the assembly general elections from the constituency Nallamada in Anantapur district. He later served as Chief Government Whip but encountered serious opposition from inside the party. In 2007 he was elected to the Legislative Council.

He along with Nara Chandra Babu launched AP Cloud Initiative at Visakhapatnam.

Palle Raghunath Reddy is the chairman of the P.V.K.K. Institute of Technology and Sri balaji education society Anantapur.

References

Living people
Telugu Desam Party politicians
Members of the Andhra Pradesh Legislative Assembly
Telugu politicians
Year of birth missing (living people)